is a Japanese manga series written and illustrated by Hiroki Endo. It was serialized in Kodansha's seinen manga magazine Evening from November 2008 to April 2016, with its chapters collected in 19 tankōbon volumes.

Publication
Written and illustrated by Hiroki Endo, All-Rounder Meguru was serialized in Kodansha's seinen manga magazine Evening from November 25, 2008, to March 8, 2016. Kodansha collected its chapters in nineteen tankōbon volumes, released from April 23, 2009, to May 23, 2016.

The manga was licensed for English digital release by Kodansha USA in 2017.

Volume list

Reception
All-Rounder Meguru was one of the Jury Recommended Works at the 18th Japan Media Arts Festival in 2014.

Notes

References

External links
 

Kodansha manga
Martial sports in anime and manga
Seinen manga